Alterite (IMA symbol: Atr) is a yellow-green mineral with the chemical formula ZnFe(SO)(CO)(OH)·17HO. Its type locality is Coconino County, Arizona.
It is found exclusively in logs that have mineralized.

References 

Zinc minerals
Iron(III) minerals
Sulfate minerals
Oxalate minerals
Hydroxide minerals
Hydrates
Minerals described in 2018